The ochre-bellied flycatcher (Mionectes oleagineus) is a small bird of the tyrant flycatcher family. It breeds from southern Mexico through Central America, and South America east of the Andes as far as southern Brazil, and on Trinidad and Tobago.

This is a common bird in humid forests, usually in undergrowth near water. It makes a moss-covered ball nest with a side entrance, which is suspended from a root or branch, often over water. The female incubates the typical clutch of two or three white eggs for 18–20 days, with about the same period for the young, initially covered with grey down, to fledge.

Adult ochre-bellied flycatchers are 12.7 cm long and weigh 11g. They have olive-green upperparts, and the head and upper breast are also green. The rest of the underparts are ochre-coloured, there are two buff wing bars, and the feathers of the closed wing are edged with buff. The male is slightly larger than the female, but otherwise similar.

There are a number of subspecies, which differ in the distinctness of the wing bars or the shade of the upperparts. This species was previously placed in the genus Pipromorpha.

Ochre-bellied flycatcher is an inconspicuous bird which, unusually for a tyrant flycatcher, feeds mainly on seeds and berries, and some insects and spiders.

The calls of the male include a high-pitched chip, and a loud choo. His display includes jumping, flutter-flight and hovering. He takes no part in rearing the young.

References

Further reading

ochre-bellied flycatcher
Birds of Central America
Birds of South America
Birds of Trinidad and Tobago
ochre-bellied flycatcher